Paul Foot may refer to:

 Paul Foot (comedian) (born 1973), English comedian
 Paul Foot (journalist) (1937–2004), British investigative journalist, political campaigner and author

See also
 Paul Foot Award